Angus Bell (born 4 October 2000) is an Australian rugby union player who plays for the NSW Waratahs in Super Rugby. His playing position is prop. He has signed to the Waratahs squad for the 2020 season. He made his debut for the Wallabies on November 7, 2020, coming on as an injury replacement for James Slipper in the 40th minute of a test match versus the New Zealand All Blacks in Brisbane. Angus is the son of former  Merewether Carlton rugby club scrum coach and Motley Crew touch football team member, Mark Bell.

Reference list

External links
Rugby.com.au profile
 

2000 births
People educated at Newington College
Australian rugby union players
Australia international rugby union players
Living people
Rugby union props
New South Wales Waratahs players
New South Wales Country Eagles players